The Choco languages (also Chocoan, Chocó, Chokó) are a small family of Native American languages spread across Colombia and Panama.

Family division
Choco consists of six known branches, all but two of which are extinct.

The Emberá languages (also known as Chocó proper, Cholo)
 Noanamá (also known as Waunana, Woun Meu)
 Anserma (†)
 Arma (†) ? (unattested)
 Sinúfana (Cenufara) (†) ?
 Caramanta (†) ?

Anserma, Arma, and Sinúfana are extinct.

The Emberá group consists of two languages mainly in Colombia with over 60,000 speakers that lie within a fairly mutually intelligible dialect continuum. Ethnologue divides this into six languages. Kaufman (1994) considers the term Cholo to be vague and condescending. Noanamá has some 6,000 speakers on the Panama-Colombia border.

Jolkesky (2016)
Internal classification by Jolkesky (2016):

(† = extinct)

Choko
Waunana
Embera
Embera, Southern: Embera Baudo; Embera Chami; Epena
Embera, Northern: Embera Katio; Embera Darien

Language contact
Jolkesky (2016) notes that there are lexical similarities with the Guahibo, Kamsa, Paez, Tukano, Witoto-Okaina, Yaruro, Chibchan, and Bora-Muinane language families due to contact.

Genetic links between Choco and Chibchan had been proposed by Lehmann (1920). However, similarities are few, some of which may be related to the adoption of maize cultivation from neighbors.

Genetic relations
Choco has been included in a number of hypothetical phylum relationships:

 within Morris Swadesh's Macro-Leco
 Antonio Tovar, Jorge A. Suárez, and Robert Gunn: related to Cariban
 Čestmír Loukotka (1944): Southern Emberá may be related to Paezan, Noanamá to Arawakan
 within Paul Rivet and Loukotka's (1950) Cariban
 Constenla Umaña and Margery Peña: may be related to Chibchan
 within Joseph Greenberg's Nuclear Paezan, most closely related to Paezan and Barbacoan
 with Yaruro according to Pache (2016)

Vocabulary
Loukotka (1968) lists the following basic vocabulary items for the Chocó languages.

Proto-language
For reconstructions of Proto-Chocó and Proto-Emberá by Constenla and Margery (1991), see the corresponding Spanish article.

See also
 Embera-Wounaan, who speak the Choco languages, Embera and Wounaan
 Quimbaya language

References

Bibliography
 Campbell, Lyle. (1997). American Indian languages: The historical linguistics of Native America. New York: Oxford University Press. .
 Constenla Umaña, Adolfo; & Margery Peña, Enrique. (1991). Elementos de fonología comparada Chocó. Filología y lingüística, 17, 137-191.
 Greenberg, Joseph H. (1987). Language in the Americas. Stanford: Stanford University Press.
 Gunn, Robert D. (Ed.). (1980). Claificación de los idiomas indígenas de Panamá, con un vocabulario comparativo de los mismos. Lenguas de Panamá (No. 7). Panama: Instituto Nacional de Cultura, Instituto Lingüístico de Verano.
 Kaufman, Terrence. (1990). Language history in South America: What we know and how to know more. In D. L. Payne (Ed.), Amazonian linguistics: Studies in lowland South American languages (pp. 13–67). Austin: University of Texas Press. .
 Kaufman, Terrence. (1994). The native languages of South America. In C. Mosley & R. E. Asher (Eds.), Atlas of the world's languages (pp. 46–76). London: Routledge.
 Loewen, Jacob. (1963). Choco I & Choco II.  International Journal of American Linguistics, 29.
 Licht, Daniel Aguirre. (1999). Embera. Languages of the world/materials 208. LINCOM.
 Mortensen, Charles A. (1999). A reference grammar of the Northern Embera languages. Studies in the languages of Colombia (No.7); SIL publications in linguistics (No. 134). SIL.
Pinto García, C. (1974/1978). Los indios katíos: su cultura - su lengua. Medellín: Editorial Gran-América.
Rendón G., G. (2011). La lengua Umbra: Descubrimiento - Endolingüística - Arqueolingüística. Manizales: Zapata.
 Rivet, Paul; & Loukotka, Cestmír. (1950). Langues d'Amêrique du sud et des Antilles. In A. Meillet & M. Cohen (Eds.), Les langues du monde (Vol. 2). Paris: Champion.
Sara, S. I. (2002). A tri-lingual dictionary of Emberá-English-Spanish. (Languages of the World/Dictionaries, 38). Munich: Lincom Europa.
 Suárez, Jorge. (1974). South American Indian languages. The new Encyclopædia Britannica (15th ed.). Chicago: Encyclopædia Britannica.
 Swadesh, Morris. (1959). Mapas de clasificación lingüística de México y las Américas. México: Universidad Nacional Autónoma de México.
 Tovar, Antonio; & Larrucea de Tovar, Consuelo. (1984). Catálogo de las lenguas de América del Sur (nueva ed.). Madrid: Editorial Gedos. .

External links

 Proel: Familia Chocó

 
Language families
Indigenous languages of Central America
Indigenous languages of the South American Northwest